Yves or Evodius, Lisoie, Yvoire, or Evodius, was an early bishop of Rouen. He is considered to be a saint by the Roman Catholic Church with a feast day celebrated on 8 October.

There is a legend that relates a fire that would turn off when "wet with tears [of his] prayers." The only place in France dedicated and named after him is the Abbey Church of St. Yved in Braine, but the Master of the Rouen Cathedral is known today as  St. Evodius Master.

He died in 422 in Andelys, but his tomb is in the grounds of the Rouen Cathedral. To protect the relics from the Norman invasions, they were transported in the 9th century to the fort of Braine, but in the 19th century were reinterred in Rouen Cathedral under the authority of Cardinal Bonnechose, archbishop of Rouen.

References

French Roman Catholic saints
6th-century births
6th-century Frankish bishops